Tim Phivana (born 3 June 1940) is a former Cambodian cyclist. He competed in the sprint at the 1964 Summer Olympics.

References

External links
 

1940 births
Living people
Cambodian male cyclists
Olympic cyclists of Cambodia
Cyclists at the 1964 Summer Olympics
Place of birth missing (living people)